Oldemiro Júlio Marques Balói (April 9, 1955 – April 12, 2021) was a Mozambican political figure who served in the government of Mozambique as Minister of Foreign Affairs from 2008 to 2017.

Career
Balói served as Deputy Minister of Cooperation in the early 1990s, then as Minister of Industry, Trade and Tourism from 1994 to 1999. He was subsequently active in the International Bank of Mozambique, serving as a member of its board of directors and its executive board. On March 10, 2008 he was appointed Minister of Foreign Affairs, replacing Alcinda Abreu.

See also
List of foreign ministers in 2017
List of current foreign ministers

References

2021 deaths
FRELIMO politicians
Foreign ministers of Mozambique
Industry ministers of Mozambique
Tourism ministers of Mozambique
Trade ministers of Mozambique
1955 births